Candlelight or Candlelighting or Candlelighter may refer to:
Light created by a candle
Candlelighting, the lighting of Shabbat candles
A candlelight vigil, an outdoor assembly of people carrying candles, held after sunset in order to show support for a specific cause
Candlelighter (person), or candle-lighter (κανδηλάπτης, kandilaptis) Semantron, Acolyte
Candlelighter (device), or candle lighter 
"The Candle Lighter", List of works by Frederik Pohl 1955
Candlelighters or Candlelighters Childhood Cancer Foundation, American Childhood Cancer Organization, a charitable organization

Music
Candlelight Records, an independent record label
"Candlelight" (Csézy song)
"Candlelight" (Six by Seven song)
"Candlelight", a song by Janis Ian on the album Miracle Row
"Candlelight", a song by Labelle on the album Back to Now
"Candlelight" (The Maccabeats song), 2010
"Candlelight", a song by Relient K on the album Forget and Not Slow Down
"Candlelights" (song), Bix Beiderbecke tune
Soft, slow and almost fully acoustic edits or remixes of certain types of Dance songs. E.g. "DJ Sammy & Yanou ft. Do - Heaven (Candlelight Mix)"